Quarna may refer to:

 Quarna Sotto, comune in the Province of Verbano-Cusio-Ossola in the Italian region Piedmont
 Quarna Sopra, comune in the Province of Verbano-Cusio-Ossola in the Italian region Piedmont